Jan-Sören Eckert (born 4 December 1965 in Quickborn, West Germany)  has previously played with Charon, Mydra, Rockship/Band with Inga Rumpf, Eddi Filip, Dirk Erchinger, Alex Conti;Das Auge Gottes/Band; Running Wild and Masterplan and is currently playing for the melodic power metal band Iron Savior.

Jan also happens to appear partly as a lead singer in Iron Savior due to the fact that Piet and Jan share some songs and give each other space doing that. He left the band in 2002 to join the new supergroup formed in by former Helloween members Roland Grapow and Uli Kusch, with Norwegian vocalist Jørn Lande (former member of bands Ark and Beyond Twilight), called Masterplan. Jan used to do the main backing vocals for Masterplan during live performances.

Jan performed with German heavy metal band Running Wild for their farewell show at Wacken Open Air on 30 July 2009. It was recorded for a CD and DVD release that was released to the public in June 2011 as The Final Jolly Roger.

In 2011, he returned to Iron Savior and is featured on the albums The Landing, on the 2014 album Rise of the Hero, "Live at the Final Frontier"- Live Recording 2015, "Titan craft" album 2016 plus: Reforged/"Riding on Fire" 2017.

Discography

Iron Savior
 Unification (1999)
 Interlude (EP) (1999)
 Dark Assault (2001)
 Condition Red (2002)
 The Landing (2011)
 Rise of the Hero (2014)
 Titancraft (2016)

Masterplan
 Back for My Life EP (2004)
 Aeronautics (2005)
 Lost and Gone EP (2007)
 MK II (2007)
 Far From the End of the World EP (2010)
 Time to Be King (2010)

Running Wild
 The Final Jolly Roger (Live album) (2011)

References

External links
 Masterplan's website

1965 births
Living people
People from Pinneberg (district)
German heavy metal bass guitarists
Male bass guitarists
Masterplan (band) members
Iron Savior members
German male guitarists